Papillocithara is a genus of sea snails, marine gastropod mollusks in the family Mangeliidae.

Species
 Papillocithara hebes Kilburn, 1992
 Papillocithara semiplicata Kilburn, 1992

References

 Kilburn R.N. 1992. Turridae (Mollusca: Gastropoda) of southern Africa and Mozambique. Part 6. Subfamily Mangeliinae, section 1. Annals of the Natal Museum, 33: 461–575. page(s): 516-517

External links
 
 Worldwide Mollusc Species Data Base: Mangeliidae
 Bouchet, P.; Kantor, Y. I.; Sysoev, A.; Puillandre, N. (2011). A new operational classification of the Conoidea (Gastropoda). Journal of Molluscan Studies. 77(3): 273-308

 
Gastropod genera